Sketch or Sketches may refer to:

 Sketch (drawing), a rapidly executed freehand drawing that is not usually intended as a finished work

Arts, entertainment and media 
 Sketch comedy, a series of short scenes or vignettes called sketches

Film and television 
 Sketch (2007 film), a Malayalam film
 Sketch (2018 film), a Tamil film
 Sketch (TV series), a 2018 South Korean series
 "Sketch", a 2008 episode of Skins
 Sketch (Skins character)
 Sketch with Kevin McDonald, a 2006 CBC television special

Literature
 Sketch story, or sketch, a very short piece of writing
 Daily Sketch, a British newspaper 1909–1971
 The Sketch, a British illustrated weekly journal 1893–1959

Music
 Sketch (music), an informal document prepared by a composer to assist in composition
 The Sketches, a Pakistani Sufi folk rock band 

 Sketch (album), by Ex Norwegian, 2011
 Sketch (EP), by Hyomin, 2016
 Sketches (album), by Bert Jansch, 1990
 Sketches, a 2008 album by Ane Brun
 Sketches, a 2012 EP by Newton Faulkner
 Sketches, a 1994 album by Vince Mendoza
 Sketches, a 1972 album by Chris Connor
 Sketches, a 2014 album by Inga and Anush Arshakyan

Computing 
 Sketch (software), a vector graphics editor 
 Skencil, formerly Sketch, a vector graphics editor
 Sketch, an approximation by a streaming algorithm
 Sketch, a program written with the Arduino IDE
 Sketch, a program written with the Processing IDE

Mathematics 
 Curve sketching, techniques for producing a rough idea of overall shape of a plane curve
 Sketch (mathematics), in the mathematical theory of categories

People
 Katie Sketch, vocalist of band The Organ
 Jason Scott Sadofsky (born 1970), pseudonym Sketch, American archivist, filmmaker and performer

Other uses
 sketch (restaurant), a restaurant in London, England

See also

 Sketchy (disambiguation)